Brett Anderson (born 8 September 1986) is an Australian former professional rugby league footballer who last played for the Northern Pride in the Queensland Cup. He previously played in the National Rugby League for Parramatta Eels, North Queensland Cowboys and Melbourne Storm.

Early life
Anderson was born in Innisfail, Queensland, Australia, and he was educated at Innisfail State High School, where he represented 2003 Australian Schoolboys.

Playing career
Anderson made his first grade debut NRL for Parramatta in 2004. He later made one appearance for North Queensland in 2007. He then signed with Melbourne during the 2008, transferring from Cowboys feeder club Northern Pride.

He made his Melbourne debut in round 10 of the 2008 NRL season against St. George Illawarra. He scored tries in his last three appearances for Melbourne.

He also played 129 games for the Northern Pride in the Queensland Cup, scoring 70 tries; and 10 games for the North Queensland Young Guns, scoring 7 tries. He was a member of the Northern Pride's 2010 Queensland Cup team, and captain of the 2014 Queensland Cup premiership team, scoring a try in the 2014 grand final.  He came out of retirement to win the Pride's player of the year award in 2018.

Anderson is not related to former Melbourne identities Ben, Chris or Scott.

Coaching
Anderson coached the Serbia team for one fixture on 20 October 2018 at the Makiš Stadium, Belgrade in a 24-20 victory over Spain, as part of the 2018 European Championship B.

References

External links
Melbourne Storm profile
Northern Pride profile
Melbourne's faceless men

1986 births
Living people
Australian rugby league players
Melbourne Storm players
North Queensland Cowboys players
Northern Pride RLFC players
Parramatta Eels players
Rugby league centres
Rugby league players from Innisfail, Queensland
Rugby league wingers
Serbia national rugby league team coaches